Chromosome 22 is one of the 23 pairs of chromosomes in human cells. Humans normally have two copies of chromosome 22 in each cell. Chromosome 22 is the second smallest human chromosome, spanning about 51 million DNA base pairs and representing between 1.5 and 2% of the total DNA in cells.

In 1999, researchers working on the Human Genome Project announced they had determined the sequence of base pairs that make up this chromosome. Chromosome 22 was the first human chromosome to be fully sequenced.

Human chromosomes are numbered by their apparent size in the karyotype, with Chromosome 1 being the largest and Chromosome 22 having originally been identified as the smallest. However, genome sequencing has revealed that Chromosome 21 is actually smaller than Chromosome 22.

Genes

Number of genes 
The following are some of the gene count estimates of human chromosome 22. Because researchers use different approaches to genome annotation, their predictions of the number of genes on each chromosome varies (for technical details, see gene prediction). Among various projects, the collaborative consensus coding sequence project (CCDS) takes an extremely conservative strategy. So CCDS's gene number prediction represents a lower bound on the total number of human protein-coding genes.

Gene list 

The following is a partial list of genes on human chromosome 22. For complete list, see the link in the infobox on the right.

Diseases and disorders
The following diseases are some of those related to genes on chromosome 22:

 Amyotrophic lateral sclerosis
 Breast cancer
 Cat eye syndrome
 Chronic myeloid leukemia
 DiGeorge Syndrome
 Desmoplastic small round cell tumor
 22q11.2 distal deletion syndrome
 22q13 deletion syndrome or Phelan-McDermid syndrome
 Emanuel syndrome
 Ewing sarcoma 
 Focal Segmental Glomerulosclerosis
 Li-Fraumeni syndrome
 Metachromatic leukodystrophy
 Methemoglobinemia
 Neurofibromatosis type 2
 Opitz G/BBB syndrome
 Renal Medullary Carcinoma
 Rubinstein-Taybi syndrome
 Waardenburg syndrome
 Schizophrenia

Chromosomal conditions
The following conditions are caused by changes in the structure or number of copies of chromosome 22:
 22q11.2 deletion syndrome: Most people with 22q11.2 deletion syndrome are missing about 3 million base pairs on one copy of chromosome 22 in each cell. The deletion occurs near the middle of the chromosome at a location designated as q11.2. This region contains about 30 genes, but many of these genes have not been well characterized. A small percentage of affected individuals have shorter deletions in the same region.The loss of one particular gene, TBX1, is thought to be responsible for many of the characteristic features of 22q11.2 deletion syndrome, such as heart defects, an opening in the roof of the mouth (a cleft palate), distinctive facial features, and low calcium levels. A loss of this gene does not appear to cause learning disabilities, however. Other genes in the deleted region are also likely to contribute to the signs and symptoms of 22q11.2 deletion syndrome.
 22q11.2 distal deletion syndrome
 22q13 deletion syndrome 
 Other chromosomal conditions: Other changes in the number or structure of chromosome 22 can have a variety of effects, including intellectual disability, delayed development, physical abnormalities, and other medical problems. These changes include an extra piece of chromosome 22 in each cell (partial trisomy), a missing segment of the chromosome in each cell (partial monosomy), and a circular structure called ring chromosome 22 that is caused by the breakage and reattachment of both ends of the chromosome.
 Cat-eye syndrome is a rare disorder most often caused by a chromosomal change called an inverted duplicated 22. A small extra chromosome is made up of genetic material from chromosome 22 that has been abnormally duplicated (copied). The extra genetic material causes the characteristic signs and symptoms of cat-eye syndrome, including an eye abnormality called ocular iris coloboma (a gap or split in the colored part of the eye), small skin tags or pits in front of the ear, heart defects, kidney problems, and, in some cases, delayed development.
 A rearrangement (translocation) of genetic material between chromosomes 9 and 22 is associated with several types of blood cancer (leukemia). This chromosomal abnormality, which is commonly called the Philadelphia chromosome, is found only in cancer cells. The Philadelphia chromosome has been identified in most cases of a slowly progressing form of blood cancer called chronic myeloid leukemia, or CML. It also has been found in some cases of more rapidly progressing blood cancers (acute leukemias). The presence of the Philadelphia chromosome can help predict how the cancer will progress and provides a target for molecular therapies.
 Emanuel Syndrome is a translocation of chromosomes 11 and 22. Originally known as Supernumerary der (22) Syndrome, it occurs when an individual has an extra chromosome composed of pieces of the 11th and 22nd chromosomes.

Cytogenetic band

References

Further reading

External links

 
 

Chromosome 22